The Chitwood Bridge is a covered bridge in Lincoln County in the U.S. state of Oregon.  The bridge carries Chitwood Road, off U.S. Route 20, over the Yaquina River at Chitwood. The structure was added to the National Register of Historic Places in 1979.

Historically, Chitwood was a station on the railway line between Corvallis and Toledo. It was named for Joshua Chitwood, who lived nearby during construction of the railway, 1881–85. Trains still use the railway, but they no longer stop in Chitwood.

Lincoln County built the covered bridge in 1926. Scheduled for demolition, it was instead improved in 1984 through a federally funded restoration project.

See also
 List of bridges on the National Register of Historic Places in Oregon
 List of covered bridges in Oregon

References

External links
 

Bridges completed in 1926
Bridges in Lincoln County, Oregon
Covered bridges on the National Register of Historic Places in Oregon
Wooden bridges in Oregon
Tourist attractions in Lincoln County, Oregon
National Register of Historic Places in Lincoln County, Oregon
Road bridges on the National Register of Historic Places in Oregon
Howe truss bridges in the United States